Patricia Iveth Kú Flores (born 17 December 1993) is a Peruvian former tennis player.

She won four singles and four doubles titles on the ITF Women's Circuit. On 1 April 2013, she reached her best singles ranking of world No. 327. On 29 October 2012, she peaked at No. 456 in the doubles rankings.

Since her debut for the Peru Fed Cup team in 2010, Kú Flores has a win–loss record of 13–10 in the competition.

ITF finals

Singles (4–6)

Doubles (4–5)

References

External links
 
 
 

1993 births
Living people
Sportspeople from Lima
Peruvian female tennis players
Tennis players at the 2011 Pan American Games
Pan American Games competitors for Peru
Competitors at the 2010 South American Games
21st-century Peruvian women
20th-century Peruvian women